David Galloway may refer to:
 David Galloway (rugby league) (1884–1913), rugby league footballer of the 1900s and 1910s
 David Galloway (footballer) (1905–1979), association football player
 David Galloway (writer) (born 1937), American novelist, journalist, curator
 David Galloway (botanist) (1942–2014), New Zealand lichenologist
 David A. Galloway (born 1943), chairman of the board of Bank of Montreal
David Galloway (golfer) (born 1951), Australian professional golfer
 David Galloway (American football) (born 1959), former American football player